Gustav Schwalbe (with variations) could refer to:

Gustav Christian Schwabe (1813–1897), German-born merchant and financier
Gustav Albert Schwalbe (1844–1916), German anatomist and anthropologist
Gustav Schwab (1792–1850), German writer, pastor and publisher